Huejuquilla El Alto   is a town and municipality, in Jalisco in central-western Mexico. The municipality covers an area of 717.26 km².

As of 2005, the municipality had a total population of 7,926.

References

Municipalities of Jalisco